Patrick Kennedy may refer to:

Politics
 P. J. Kennedy (1858–1929), member of Massachusetts House of Representatives, businessman, grandfather of John F. Kennedy
 Patrick F. Kennedy (born 1949), Under Secretary of State
 Patrick J. Kennedy (born 1967), Rhode Island congressman and son of Ted Kennedy
 Patrick Kennedy (Canadian politician) (1832–1895), Irish-born contractor and political figure in Quebec
 Patrick Kennedy (Irish nationalist politician) (1864–1947), Irish nationalist Member of Parliament
 Patrick Kennedy (Limerick politician) (1941–2020), Fine Gael senator 1981–1992

Other
 Patrick Kennedy (1786–1850), Bishop of Killaloe
 Patrick Kennedy (folklorist) (1801–1873), bookseller in Dublin
 Patrick Bouvier Kennedy (1963–1963), son of John F. Kennedy who died in infancy
 Patrick Kennedy (swimmer) (born 1964), American swimmer
 Patrick Kennedy (actor) (born 1977), English actor
 Patrick Kennedy (director) (born 1985), British theatre director
 Patrick G. Kennedy (1881–1966), Irish Jesuit priest, naturalist and ornithologist
 Patrick Kennedy (banker), governor of the Bank of Ireland
 J. Patrick Kennedy, founder and owner of international software company OSIsoft
 Patrick O. Kennedy, the appellant in Kennedy v. Louisiana, which outlawed the death penalty for all crimes except murder

See also 
 Patrick Joseph Kennedy (disambiguation)
 Pat Kennedy (born 1952), basketball coach
 Paddy Kennedy (disambiguation)